Temtem is a massively multiplayer online role-playing game (MMORPG) developed by Spanish development studio Crema, and published by Humble Bundle. The game was released in early access through Steam on January 21, 2020, and PlayStation 5 on December 8, 2020 with the Nintendo Switch and Xbox Series X/S versions of the game was released alongside the full release of the game on September 6, 2022. The game uses the Unity development engine, and is a creature-collection video game greatly inspired by Nintendo's Pokémon series. The game was partly funded through the crowdfunding platform Kickstarter, from May to June 2018.

Synopsis and gameplay
Temtem'''s gameplay is largely inspired by the Pokémon series. Players explore the area capturing the eponymous Temtem creatures and command them in double battles against other Temtem controlled by an NPC or another player. All battles in Temtem happen in a 2x2 environment, similar to double battles in Pokémon series

In the game, players assume the role of a novice Temtem tamer who starts their journey around the six floating islands of the Airborne Archipelago while facing the threat of Clan Belsoto, an evil organization that plans to take over the islands by force.

 Development Temtem is developed by Crema, a Spanish game development studio. The game was first announced on crowdfunding platform Kickstarter in May 2018, with an initial fundraising goal of €61,000. Temtem was launched on Steam's Early Access on January 21, 2020.

On August 6, 2020, it was announced that Temtem would be released on Nintendo Switch, PlayStation 5 and Xbox Series X/S in 2021. On October 26, 2020, it was announced that the game would be releasing in early access on PlayStation 5 on December 8, 2020.

 Sales Temtem'' sold over 500,000 units on Steam in its first month.

References

External links
 
 Official Wiki

2022 video games
Active massively multiplayer online games
Cancelled PlayStation 4 games
Cancelled Xbox One games
Cooperative video games
Crowdfunded video games
Early access video games
Humble Games games
Indie video games
Kickstarter-funded video games
Massively multiplayer online role-playing games
Nintendo Switch games
Open-world video games
PlayStation 5 games
Video games developed in Spain
Virtual economies
Windows games
Xbox Series X and Series S games
Collecting